"You Ain't Just Whistlin' Dixie" is a song written by David Bellamy, and recorded by American country music duo The Bellamy Brothers.  It was released in August 1979 as the third single from the album The Two and Only.  The song reached number 5 on the Billboard Hot Country Singles & Tracks chart.

In 2005, the Bellamy Brothers re-recorded the song with Alan Jackson for their album Angels & Outlaws, Vol. 1.

Chart performance

References

1979 singles
2005 singles
The Bellamy Brothers songs
Alan Jackson songs
Warner Records singles
Curb Records singles
Songs written by David Bellamy (singer)
1979 songs
Songs about the American South